Shina Rambo (born c. 1958) is a former bandit and armed robbery kingpin who terrorised SouthWest Nigeria in the 1990s. He was born in Abeokuta, Ogun State. He was a fetishist and believed in rituals and human sacrifices. He later became a pastor after he was released from prison  during Olusegun Obasanjo's regime and afterwards he preached the Gospel.  The police may still be wondering that the same man they claimed to have killed a long time ago is still alive.

References

1960s births
Crimes involving Satanism or the occult
Living people
Male serial killers
Nigerian serial killers